Sungurlare is a town in southeastern Bulgaria, part of Burgas Province. It is the administrative centre of Sungurlare municipality, which lies in the northwestern part of Burgas Province.

Sungurlare lies in a valley 80 kilometres west-northwest of Burgas, 25 kilometres west of Karnobat. The area has been inhabited since antiquity, with several Thracian mounds, pottery and Ancient Roman coins discovered. The present town was first mentioned in Ottoman tax registers in the 16th century. 44 local families moved to present Ukraine during the Ottoman rule of Bulgaria, founding Bulgarian colonies in Crimea.

The town is a well-known centre of winery in Bulgaria, with strong traditions in the production of Bulgarian wine. A museum dedicated to viticulture and winery was founded in Sungurlare in 1984, accommodated in the 1882 house of rich local wine dealers.

Municipality

Sungurlare municipality includes the following 30 places:

Gallery

External links
 Sungurlare municipality website 

Towns in Bulgaria
Populated places in Burgas Province